Hatam–Mansim is a small language family of New Guinea, consisting of two languages:
Hatam
Mansim (Borai)

Ross (2005) tentatively classified Hatam as a branch of the West Papuan family, based on similarities in pronouns (he did not consider Mansim), but Glottolog continues to list Hatam–Mansim as an independent family.  Following Reesink (2002), Glottolog lists Mansim as a language distinct from Hattam: "comparisons of old wordlists (e.g. von der Gabelentz & Meyer 1882) readily confirm this difference."

See also
Mantion–Meax languages

References

 

 
East Bird's Head languages
Languages of western New Guinea